The canton of Dampierre-sur-Salon is an administrative division of the Haute-Saône department, northeastern France. Its borders were modified at the French canton reorganisation which came into effect in March 2015. Its seat is in Dampierre-sur-Salon.

Composition

It consists of the following communes:
 
Achey
Argillières
Attricourt
Autet
Autrey-lès-Gray
Auvet-et-la-Chapelotte
Bouhans-et-Feurg
Brotte-lès-Ray
Broye-les-Loups-et-Verfontaine
Champlitte
Chargey-lès-Gray
Courtesoult-et-Gatey
Dampierre-sur-Salon
Delain
Denèvre
Écuelle
Fahy-lès-Autrey
Fédry
Ferrières-lès-Ray
Fleurey-lès-Lavoncourt
Fouvent-Saint-Andoche
Framont
Francourt
Grandecourt
Larret
Lavoncourt
Lœuilley
Membrey
Mont-Saint-Léger
Montot
Montureux-et-Prantigny
Oyrières
Percey-le-Grand
Pierrecourt
Poyans
Ray-sur-Saône
Recologne
Renaucourt
Rigny
Roche-et-Raucourt
Savoyeux
Theuley
Tincey-et-Pontrebeau
Vaite
Vanne
Vars
Vauconcourt-Nervezain
Vereux
Villers-Vaudey
Volon

Councillors

Pictures of the canton

References

Cantons of Haute-Saône